The Symphony Orchestra Vorarlberg (SOV) is the only full-professional orchestra in the Austrian federal state Vorarlberg.

External links
Symphony Orchestra Vorarlberg – SOV

Austrian orchestras